Siege of Kanegasaki may refer to:

 Siege of Kanegasaki (1337)
 Siege of Kanegasaki (1570)